Amorha Khas is a gram panchayat in Basti district in the Indian state of Uttar Pradesh. In the freedom struggle of 1857, about 250 martyrs of Amorha State were hanged by the British Government from peepal trees located at Chhawani.

Geography

History
Amorha was ruled by the indigenous Bhars & Kshatriyas drove out the Bhars by force and founded an estate known as the Amorha Raj.

Raja Zalim Singh was the King of Amorha. He was a Suryavanshi Rajput and Suryavanshi Rajputs of Basti and Ayodhya are his descendants. 
Raja Zalim Singh along with the Nawab of Oudh fought against the British imperialists for India's Freedom Struggle. On 13th Aug 1857, the British imperialists realised it was very difficult to establish their rule in Amorha due to fierce resistance by the Raja. This forced the British officer, Col. Robert Craft, to back off from the region on 2nd Mar 1858. The last queen of Amorha, and the wife of Raja Zalim Singh, Rani Talash Kanwar, took arms against the British and was killed in a bloody battle.

Raja Zalim Singh was a brave Indian freedom fighter. He repulsed all British invasions in his region. He defended his territory against the British with utmost valour for a long time until one day when he was taken off guard and surrounded by the British army. He managed to escape via a secret tunnel and continued to fight guerrilla warfare against the British.

Demographics
 India census, Amorha Khas is a large village located in Harraiya of Basti district, Uttar Pradesh with a total of 1009 families residing there. The Amorha Khas village has population of 5977 of which 2933 are males while 3044 are females as per Population Census 2011.

Famous places 
Amorha Khas is situated at a distance of 41 km from the district headquarters. Its old name was Ambodha, and it was once a province (state) of Surajbansi Rajput Raja Zalim Singh. Zalim Singh's Mahal is here, Old wall of mahal is still there with the mark of a bullet used by the English. Also a temple Ramrekha Mandir is here.

Gallery

References

Cities and towns in Basti district
Villages in Basti district